Erica Curtis (born June 12, 1991 as Erica Trickett) is a Canadian curler from Paradise, Newfoundland and Labrador. She currently plays third on Team Stacie Curtis.

Career
Curtis made three appearances at the Canadian Junior Curling Championships in 2008, 2011 and 2012. In 2008, she finished 5–7 as lead for Julie Devereaux. In 2011, she again finished 5–7 this time as lead for Erin Porter. Her final trip in 2012, she skipped the Newfoundland and Labrador team to a 3–9 record. She also competed in two U Sports/Curling Canada University Curling Championships, finishing 4–3 in 2011 and 2–5 in 2012.

Out of juniors, she joined the Heather Strong rink at second. They played in the 2012 Masters Tier 2 Grand Slam of Curling event where they qualified for the playoffs before losing to Chelsea Carey in the quarterfinals. They finished second at the 2013 Newfoundland and Labrador Scotties Tournament of Hearts, only losing by one point in the final to Stacie Curtis. She later joined Marie Christianson's rink for the 2014–15 season however they had limited success on tour and failed to qualify for the playoffs at provincials.

Curtis won her first Newfoundland and Labrador Scotties Tournament of Hearts in 2017 as lead for Stacie Curtis. They had a good showing at the 2017 Scotties Tournament of Hearts, finishing in eighth with a 5–6 record. They defended their title the following season at the 2018 Newfoundland and Labrador Scotties Tournament of Hearts, going 8–1 through the tournament. They had a great start at the 2018 Scotties Tournament of Hearts, winning their first four games before losing three straight. They then lost the tiebreaker to Ontario's Hollie Duncan and were eliminated. They officially finished tenth for the tournament, losing the ninth place seeding game to New Brunswick's Sylvie Robichaud.

Curtis began skipping her own team the following season. They didn't play in any tour events and failed to qualify at the 2019 Newfoundland and Labrador Scotties Tournament of Hearts. The following year however, they won three straight sudden death games to win the 2020 Newfoundland and Labrador Scotties Tournament of Hearts. At the 2020 Scotties Tournament of Hearts, they finished in fourteenth place with a 1–6 record.

Personal life
Curtis is a recreational specialist at Eastern Health. She is married to Dylan Curtis.

Teams

References

External links

1991 births
Canadian women curlers
Curlers from Newfoundland and Labrador
Living people
Sportspeople from St. John's, Newfoundland and Labrador
People from Paradise, Newfoundland and Labrador
21st-century Canadian women